John Howard Te Reo (born 5 June 1986) is a New Zealand former professional rugby league footballer who last played for the Wynnum Manly Seagulls in the Brisbane Rugby League. In 2007, he occasionally played first-grade for the Brisbane Broncos in the NRL competition.

Playing career
Te Reo was added to the Broncos' Top 25 player list in 2007 after winning his club's player of the year award in the Queensland Cup. At the beginning of the season, he was behind Shaun Berrigan and Ian Lacey for the position of hooker in the team. On the occasions that he played first-grade, he normally started the match on the interchange bench.

On 9 October 2007, the Broncos announced that they would be terminating Te Reo's contract following allegations that he, along with fellow forward Ian Lacey, assaulted a 32-year-old man in Charlotte Street, in central Brisbane, on 6 October. He then joined the Wynnum Manly Seagulls Queensland Cup team through FOGS then was promoted to Queensland Cup, he also played against his former teammate Ian Lacey.

On 2 November 2010, the Brisbane Broncos reinstated Te Reo into their playing stocks. They are the second club (after the Sydney Roosters with Jake Friend) in recent history to reinstate a player after being sacked by the same club. However, he failed to play another game for the club after being reinstated.

References

External links

 http://www.news.com.au/heraldsun/story/0,21985,22557001-5005961,00.html

1986 births
Living people
Brisbane Broncos players
New Zealand Māori rugby league players
New Zealand rugby league players
Rugby league hookers
Sporting Olympique Avignon players
Wynnum Manly Seagulls players